Greeneville is a neighborhood of the city of Norwich, Connecticut, located northeast of downtown Norwich along the west bank of the Shetucket River.  Most of the neighborhood is designated Greeneville Historic District, a historic district that is listed on the National Register of Historic Places.

The district was listed on the National Register in 2005 and includes 683 contributing buildings, seven other contributing structures, and one other contributing site over a  area.

The district is drawn to "correspond to the village as it was laid out in 1833, but also include additional streets laid out and developed in the late nineteenth and early twentieth centuries to accommodate population growth.  Areas north and south of the district boundaries were excluded...." as those areas included undeveloped land, or fewer contributing relative to non-contributing buildings, or reflected a "shift in architectural character."

According to the Connecticut Trust for Historic Preservation the district "is a historically significant industrial village that was created to support and sustain water-powered industry from 1828 to about 1940. Much of the enduring success of this industrial enterprise can be attributed to the entrepreneurial vision of industrialist William P. Greene (1795–1862). His development of this planned community and a company to deliver a centralized power system, combined with significant technological infrastructure improvements in the late 19th century, supported the largest industrial presence in Norwich. Although nominally a part of the City of Norwich after 1875, from its creation in 1833 until after World War I Greeneville remained a relatively independent and self-sufficient, working-class community-an evolution fully expressed by the district's large, cohesive collection of generally well-preserved domestic, institutional and commercial architecture. While much of the architecture has the vernacular character expected in a mill town, the district also includes representative examples of the major styles of the period, including Greek Revival, Second Empire, Italianate, and Carpenter Gothic."

See also
 Neighborhoods of Norwich, Connecticut
 National Register of Historic Places listings in New London County, Connecticut

References

External links

National Register of Historic Places in New London County, Connecticut
Gothic Revival architecture in Connecticut
Norwich, Connecticut
Historic districts in New London County, Connecticut
Historic districts on the National Register of Historic Places in Connecticut